Palladam taluk is a taluk of Tirupur district of the Indian state of Tamil Nadu. The headquarters of the taluk is the town of Palladam.

Demographics
According to the 2011 census, the taluk of Palladam had a population of 245,428 with 123,506  males and 121,922 females. There were 987 women for every 1000 men. The taluk had a literacy rate of 70.01. Child population in the age group below 6 was 11,908 Males and 11,494 Females.

References 

Taluks of Tiruppur district